"Where Has Everybody Gone?" is a song by English-American rock band the Pretenders. It was one of two songs recorded by the band for the 1987 James Bond film The Living Daylights, the other being "If There Was a Man". "Where Has Everybody Gone?" peaked at number 26 on the United States Billboard Mainstream Rock Tracks chart.

Both "Where Has Everybody Gone?" and "If There Was a Man" are included on The Living Daylights soundtrack, as well as an instrument remix of the former. In the film, the henchman Necros is seen listening to the song through his earphones several times and the song starts up a few times when he appears on screen. An instrumental version plays during the fight between Necros and Agent Green-4 at the MI6 safe house, and then again when Necros and Bond fight aboard the Soviet cargo plane.

Personnel
Chrissie Hynde - rhythm guitar, lead vocals, occasional harmonica
Robbie McIntosh - lead guitar, backing vocals
Malcolm Foster - bass, backing vocals
Rupert Black - keyboards
Blair Cunningham - drums, backing vocals, occasional percussion

See also
 Outline of James Bond

References

1987 singles
The Pretenders songs
Songs from James Bond films
The Living Daylights
1987 songs
Songs written by Chrissie Hynde
Songs with music by John Barry (composer)
Warner Records singles